Lallan Kumar Saraf is an Indian politician. He was elected to the Bihar Legislative Council as nominated member from Janata Dal (United). He is son of former member of the Bihar Legislative Council, Lakhi Prasad Saraf.

References

Living people
Members of the Bihar Legislative Council
Janata Dal (United) politicians
Year of birth missing (living people)
Place of birth missing (living people)